During the 2009–10 English football season, Ipswich Town competed in the Football League Championship.

The 2009–10 football season marked the 131st year of existence of Ipswich Town Football Club.  Additionally, it marked the club's 74th anniversary of turning professional and was the club's 71st consecutive season in the English football league system.

The 2009–10 season was Roy Keane's first full season as manager of Ipswich Town. Ipswich Town competed in the Football League Championship, finishing 15th out of the 24 teams.  The club also competed in the Football League Cup, where it was eliminated in the Second Round, and the FA Cup, where it was eliminated in the Fourth Round.

Players

First-team squad
Squad at end of season

Left club during season

Reserve squad

Coaching staff

Pre-season
Ipswich traveled to the Republic of Ireland for pre-season in 2009, playing friendlies against Irish sides Finn Harps, Waterford and Cork City. The squad also spent time in Portugal on a four-day training camp. On the 25 July Ipswich played Colchester United in a testimonial match for retired former player Fabian Wilnis, a match which Ipswich won 2–0.

Legend

Competitions

Football League Championship

League table

Legend

Ipswich Town's score comes first

Matches

FA Cup

As in the League Cup, Ipswich only progressed through one round of the FA Cup, falling to a 2–1 defeat against Southampton at St Mary's.  This meant Ipswich was only left with trying to improve its league position.

League Cup

Ipswich Town's League Cup campaign was disappointing.  After winning a thrilling first round tie against Shrewsbury Town, Ipswich was knocked out of the competition by Peterborough United at London Road after Ipswich striker Tamas Priskin missed a vital penalty.

Transfers

Transfers in

 Total transfer spending: £6,650,000+

Loans in

Transfers out

 Total transfer income: £750,000+

Loans out

Squad statistics
All statistics updated as of end of season

Appearances and goals

|-
! colspan=14 style=background:#dcdcdc; text-align:center| Goalkeepers

|-
! colspan=14 style=background:#dcdcdc; text-align:center| Defenders

|-
! colspan=14 style=background:#dcdcdc; text-align:center| Midfielders

|-
! colspan=14 style=background:#dcdcdc; text-align:center| Forwards

|-
! colspan=14 style=background:#dcdcdc; text-align:center| Players transferred out during the season

Goalscorers

Clean sheets

Disciplinary record

Starting 11
Considering starts in all competitions

Awards

Player awards

Football League Young Player of the Month

Notes

References

Ipswich Town F.C. seasons
Ipswich Town